Ryan Joseph Vesce (born April 7, 1982) is an American former professional ice hockey center who played in the National Hockey League (NHL) with the San Jose Sharks.

Playing career
Vesce  was born in Lloyd Harbor, New York. As a youth, he played in the 1995 and 1996 Quebec International Pee-Wee Hockey Tournaments with minor ice hockey teams from New York. He attended Portledge School and played high school hockey at Portledge School in Locust Valley,  and attended  Cornell University, playing hockey for the Big Red from 2000 until 2004. He served as captain in his senior year and was a member of the Quill and Dagger society. After graduation, Vesce played for Rögle BK of the Swedish second league HockeyAllsvenskan. He returned to North America, and played two seasons in the American Hockey League (AHL) with the Springfield Falcons and Binghamton Senators. He returned to Europe for one season with HIFK of Helsinki.

In 2008, he returned to North America to sign with the Worcester Sharks of the San Jose Sharks organization, where he was the team captain. He made his NHL debut on February 11, 2009 with San Jose against the Pittsburgh Penguins in Pittsburgh. His first career NHL goal was scored on October 17, 2009 against Martin Biron of the New York Islanders.

On June 28, 2010 he again crossed the ocean and signed a two-year deal with Russian team, Torpedo Nizhni Novgorod, of the Kontinental Hockey League.

After splitting the 2012–13 season between Sweden and Finland, on May 29, 2013, Vesce returned to the KHL signing a one-year contract with Croatian team KHL Medveščak Zagreb.

Vesce spent 6 seasons abroad before returning to North America as a free agent. On September 19, 2016, he signed a professional try-out contract to attend the training camp of the Edmonton Oilers. At the conclusion of training camp and heading into the pre-season, Vesce was released from his try-out with the Oilers on September 28, 2016.

Vesce joined Swiss club HC Lugano for the Spengler Cup in Davos and after the tournament landed a deal with HC Fribourg-Gottéron of the NL on January 18.

Vesce remained in Switzerland for the following 2017–18 season, agreeing to terms with EHC Olten of the lower tiered Swiss League (SL). He appeared in just 10 games with Olten before leaving the club and effectively retiring from professional hockey due to lingering concussion symptoms.

Personal
In 2006, Vesce co-founded the Salmon Cove lifestyle-inspired clothing line with Cornell hockey teammate Ben Wallace.

In 2018, Ryan Vesce and Sean Sullivan opened the first Matterhorn Fit location in Bonita Springs, Florida. After great success, Matterhorn Fit opened its second location in Naples, Florida, in 2021.

Matterhorn Fit’s elite sports training facility was founded with the mission to restore and empower active lifestyles through the same holistic healing and performance process used by the world’s best athletes. Their professional trainers are passionate about helping people feel their best physically, mentally, and emotionally. Their unique proprietary process, known as the Matterhorn Fit Method, helps individuals alleviate pain, remove compensation in their system, and build resilience to future injury. Matterhorn Fit Bonita Springs and Naples fitness centers offer chronic pain relief, rehabilitation, personal training, and elite training to Olympians, professional athletes, and thousands of active individuals across Southwest Florida.

In 2020, Ryan Vesce Co-Founded The Matterhorn Fit All-Ivy Showcase, designed to provide academically focused D1 prospects with direct access to the best universities in the world. The event offers deep value for NCAA coaches, athletes, families, and fans through unprecedented access, information, exposure, and feedback.

Ryan Vesce also Co-Founded, The Matterhorn Fit All-Ivy Futures, a premier event organized to provide exposure, information, and a pipeline for the top young athletes in North America to reach the next level.

In 2022, Ryan Vesce co-founded the Matterhorn Mentors platform to develop youth athletes into successful human beings by surrounding them with the influences and perspectives of some of the highest achievers in the Matterhorn network.

Career statistics

Awards and honors

References

External links

1982 births
American expatriate sportspeople in Belarus
American men's ice hockey centers
Binghamton Senators players
Cornell Big Red men's ice hockey players
HC Dinamo Minsk players
Espoo Blues players
American expatriate ice hockey players in Russia
HC Fribourg-Gottéron players
HIFK (ice hockey) players
Ice hockey players from New York (state)
KHL Medveščak Zagreb players
Living people
EHC Olten players
People from Huntington, New York
Rögle BK players
San Jose Sharks players
Skellefteå AIK players
Springfield Falcons players
Torpedo Nizhny Novgorod players
Undrafted National Hockey League players
Worcester Sharks players